Carlos Cuevas Sisó (born 27 December 1995) is a Spanish television, film, and theater actor, known for his performances in the Catalan television series Ventdelplà and Merlí.

Early life
Carlos Cuevas was born on 27 December 1995 in Montcada i Reixac, Barcelona. He started acting in commercials when he was five years old. In 2002, he made his debut in the film La mujer de hielo. Since 2004, he has worked as a dubbing actor for television and radio advertising campaigns, as well as for films. He began in the television world in an episode of Trilita, a TV3 series created by Tricicle.

In 2005, at age nine, he became known to the Catalan public thanks to his role as Biel Delmàs in the series Ventdelplà from TV3, where he appeared until the series ended in 2010.

Career
In 2012, he was in the cast of the first season of Antena 3's mystery series Luna, el misterio de Calenda, where he played Tomás, with actors including Olivia Molina and Álvaro Cervantes. At the end of that year, he returned to the stage, at the Teatre Nacional de Catalunya to star alongside Albert Espinosa, Joan Carreras i Goicoechea, and many others, in the play Els nostres tigres beuen llet. Espinosa says he has created a fictitious family with the good and the best of Catalan theatre.

From 8 May to 22 June 2013, he worked again with Emma Vilarasau, Míriam Iscla, Anna Moliner, Jordi Banacolocha, Pep Planas, Pepa López, and Joan Carreras, performing in the play Barcelona, directed by Pere Riera, which deals with the Spanish Civil War, centring on the day that Barcelona was bombed by Francoist troops. In 2015, he appeared in the film It's Now or Never, directed by María Ripoll and starring Dani Rovira and María Valverde. Also that year he joined the cast of the TV3 series Merlí, where he played Pol Rubio. The series, due to its great acceptance among the Catalan public, was later dubbed to Spanish for a nationwide broadcast in laSexta.

In 2016, he made a minor appearance in Televisión Española's series El Ministerio del Tiempo, where he played a fictional successful YouTuber. In May 2016, he starred in Shakespeare's Romeo and Juliet at Espai La Seca in Barcelona, alongside Clàudia Benito, under the direction of Marc Chornet. In September of that year he once again played Pol Rubio in the second season of Merlí. In October 2016, he joined the cast of the eighteenth season of Televisión Española's series Cuéntame cómo pasó, where he plays Marcos. With his partner in Merlí, he was in charge of welcoming 2017 in TV3's New Year's Eve broadcast.

In 2020, Cuevas played Alonso Aldama in the three part Netflix series Someone Has to Die, created by Manolo Caro.

In 2022, Cuevas played Alex in the Netflix series Smiley, with Miki Esparbé, Pepón Nieto, Meritxell Calvo and Cedrick Mugisha.

Filmography

Television

Film

Theater

References

External links
 
 Interview on Radio Flaixbac

1995 births
Living people
Male television actors from Catalonia
Male film actors from Catalonia
Male stage actors from Catalonia
People from Vallès Occidental
21st-century Spanish male actors